The Kristiansand Zoo and Amusement Park is a zoological garden and amusement park situated in of Kristiansand, Norway. Established in 1966, it has been owned by Braganza since 2004.

The Kristiansand Zoo and Amusement Park has Norway's largest collection of animals. It consists of over a hundred species of animals from around the world, that move freely on a relatively large area.

Amusement attractions include Cardamom Town, which is made to look like the town in the book by Thorbjørn Egner, and Captain Sabertooth and pirate village Abra Havn (Abra Harbor), which is taken from a theatre act by the singer and actor Terje Formoe.

History

The operating company was listed on the Oslo Stock Exchange in 1993. Ludv. G. Braathens Rederi became a partial owner in 1996. Its successor company Braganza gradually bought up shares until reaching a forty-percent stake in 2004. That year it made a successful deal to buy the entire company and the company was subsequently delisted.

The zoo
The zoo department of the park contains animals from different climate conditions, from all over the world. There are built own houses for animals that are sensitive to cold weather. Animals from the Nordic countries are located in a separate department.  The collection of animals in the park is the largest in Norway and the animals have relatively large spaces to move around.

Animals 
 Nordic wilderness - Nordic animals like wolves, wolverines, Arctic foxes, lynxes and mooses.
 Tropical department - Amphibian house with snakes, crocodiles and more. + The  chimpanzee Julius and many other monkeys in the trees, also on the outside.
 Africa - African savannah, including giraffes, zebras, lions, cheetahs and other African animals.
 Asia - Siberian tigers as well as orangutans, gibbons and red pandas.
 Heia - Area including boulders and daisies.
 KuToppen - Farm, opened in 2009, with regular Norwegian farm animals, based on the Norwegian children's TV series with the same name.

Some of the animals in the zoo department (Gallery):

Cardemom Town

For those who know Thorbjørn Egner's story about the picturesque small town, it is very easy to recognize.  The author has designed the small town as it appears. Here is the weather forecast tower, the robber's housing, police office with jail, bakery, small shops and a tram line with a singing tram driver. It is possible to sleep over in this part of the park. In the high season there are theatrical performances in Norwegian.

Captain Sabertooth World

In 1995 a Captain Sabertooth themed section of the Kristiansand Zoo and Amusement Park was opened. The area has a pirate village theme and contains various attractions, restaurants, and shops that are centered around the character. In the summer the park holds several shows and features, including one that allows guests to ride on Sabertooth's ship The Black Lady (in Norwegian: Den sorte dame).

Attractions
 Kaptein Sabeltanns skattkammer, a small exhibition of treasures and weapons from the Captain Sabertooth stories.
 Miriams forheksede hus, a haunted house attraction.
 Grusomme Gabriels gang
 Smokkariumet, a small room in the Captain Sabertooth castle where children that have stopped using pacifiers can place them in a coffin along with those left by others.
Sjøslag på Grashavet, a daily event where The Black Lady and the Countess will battle each other.

Restaurants
Sjørøvergrill, a pirate themed grill restaurant located next to the Kaptein Sabeltanns skattkammer.
Piratproviant, a kiosk that serves burgers, fries, and other foods.
Pizzabakeriet, a sit-down pizza restaurant located in the Pirate Theater.
Kanelbakeriet, a bakery located within the pizza restaurant.
Hevnen er SØT, a small storefront that sells cotton candy, popcorn, and other treats.

Shops
Havnehandelen, a port themed shop that sells Sabertooth themed merchandise.
Benjamins Bengalske Bazar, a shop that sells general pirate themed merchandise.
Kaptein Sabeltanns Sjørøvermagasin, a shop that sells costumes, hats, and swords.
Kapteinens Karibiske Marked, a shop that sells books, CDs and DVDs.
Maga Khans Marked, a shop that sells bags, hats, and other merchandise.

The pirate village

Abra Havn, a scenic pirate village surrounded by tall walls.
Accommodation in family apartments.

Badelandet water park 
This water park is affiliated with the area, but it requires a separate ticket. Here are water slides in many varieties both indoor and outdoor, swimming pools and a separate beach. The water park is open from mid-May to mid-September.

References

External links

  (with limited information in English)
 English version, dyreparken.no
 Kristiansand Zoo and Amusement Park www.visitnorway.com 

 
Amusement parks in Norway
Companies formerly listed on the Oslo Stock Exchange
Tourist attractions in Kristiansand
Buildings and structures in Kristiansand
Zoos in Norway
Tourism in Kristiansand